Zschokkea is a genus of mites in the family Thyasidae. There are at least three described species in Zschokkea. Zschokkea is sometimes considered a genus of the family Hydryphantidae.

Species
These three species belong to the genus Zschokkea:
 Zschokkea bruzelii Lundblad
 Zschokkea oblonga Koenike, 1892
 Zschokkea ontariensis Smith & Cook, 2009-01

References

Trombidiformes